Icacinicaryites is an extinct genus of flowering plant belonging to the order Icacinales and family Icacinaceae. Specimens have been found Paleocene beds in the Western Interior of North America  and in the Paris Basin.

The taxonomy of I. israelii is disputed.

References 

Cenozoic plants
Icacinaceae
Prehistoric angiosperm genera
Asterid genera